Bulbul Kartanbay or Bulbul Kartanbayeva (born 30 July 1993) is a Kazakh ice hockey forward and a member of the Kazakh national team,  playing in the Swiss Women's League with Neuchâtel Hockey Academy. Kartanbay is founder and owner of the first women’s ice hockey academy in Kazakhstan. She was the first player from Kazakhstan to play in the National Women's Hockey League (NWHL; renamed PHF in 2021) and to be affiliated with the Professional Women's Hockey Players Association (PWHPA).

Playing career 
Kartanbay was captain of Tomyris Astana in the Kazakh city of Astana (Nur-Sultan) before being drafted 15th overall by the Boston Blades in the 2017 CWHL Draft. In 2018, she moved to North America to tryout for the Calgary Inferno of the Canadian Women's Hockey League (CWHL). She signed her first North American contract with the NWHL's Metropolitan Riveters in 2019. After facing issues getting her visa processed – which delayed receipt of her pay until halfway through the season – she played just ten games with the Riveters before being sidelined due to a concussion sustained in a car accident.

In June 2020, Kartanbay was appointed one of the head coaches for the Princeton Tiger Lilies, an elite girls' minor and junior club in New Jersey. In September, it was announced that she was joining the New Hampshire section of the Professional Women's Hockey Players Association (PWHPA), though she ultimately became affiliated as an independent player rather than joining a regional section.

International 
Kartanbay has played over 30 games for the senior Kazakh women's national team, first making the team as a teenager in 2012 and later serving as captain.

Personal life 
Kartanbay has a degree in tourism and hospitality from the International Information Technology University in Almaty. Outside of hockey, she owns a bakery. Also, Bulbul has her own hockey brand "Kartanbay brand".

Bulbul was finalist of "100 new faces of Kazakhstan" 30 April 2021; "Forbes 30 under 30" 2021 - Sport.

She is a social entrepreneur, working on women's sports development in her country.

Career statistics

References

External links
 

1993 births
Living people
European Women's Hockey League players
Kazakhstani expatriate sportspeople in the United States
Kazakhstani expatriate ice hockey people
Kazakhstani expatriate sportspeople in Switzerland
Kazakhstani women's ice hockey forwards
Metropolitan Riveters players
Professional Women's Hockey Players Association players
Sportspeople from Almaty
Swiss Women's League players
Expatriate ice hockey players in Switzerland
Expatriate ice hockey players in the United States